Salim, Saleem or Selim may refer to:

People
Salim (name), or Saleem or Salem or Selim, a name of Arabic origin 
Salim (poet) (1800–1866)
Saleem (playwright) (fl. 1996)
Selim I, Selim II and Selim III, Ottoman Sultans 
Selim people, an ethnic group of Sudan
Salim, birth name of Mughal Emperor Jahangir

Fictional characters
 Saleem, in Corner Shop Show
 Selim Bradley, in Fullmetal Alchemist
 Pasha Selim, in Mozart's opera Die Entführung aus dem Serail
 Saleem Sinai, in Midnight's Children
 Salim Othman, in House of Ashes

Places 
 Salim, Iran (disambiguation)
 Salem, Ma'ale Iron, or Salim, Israel
 Salim, Syria
 Selim, Yenipazar, Turkey
 Selim (District), Kars, Turkey
 Selim railway station
 Salim, Nablus, West Bank

Other uses
Salim (film), a 2014 Indian Tamil-language action thriller film 
Saleem (film), a 2009 Telugu film
Selim (horse) (1802–1825), 19th-century Thoroughbred racehorse
 Salim Group, an Indonesian conglomerate
 Salim (Thai slang), a political slang in Thai
Shalim, or Salim, a Canaanite god
Grains of Selim, an African spice

See also

Ænon near Salim, place named in the Gospel of John
Salaam (disambiguation)
Salem (disambiguation)
Salem (name)
 Salimi (disambiguation)
Slim (name)
Š-L-M, the triconsonantal root of many Semitic words